This is a list of entities that have issued postage stamps at some point since stamps were introduced in 1840.  The list includes any kind of governmental entity or officially approved organisation that has issued distinctive types of stamp .  These include post offices in foreign countries and postal services organised by military occupations, international organisations, colonies, provinces, city-states and some revolutionary movements.  The list includes members of the Universal Postal Union that are also listed at postal organisations.

Many of these entities are historic and some were very short-lived indeed.  Philatelists and stamp collectors often refer to the entities that no longer issue stamps as dead countries.

The dates are the generally agreed-upon dates of first and last stamp issues.  "Date of issue" is taken to mean the date when a particular type or variation was  issued but its usage would often continue for many years.  For example, although an entity may have issued its last stamp in 1951, actual usage may have continued until 1960: in that case, 1951 is the last stamp issue date.

Besides the period of which stamps were issued in the name of a particular entity, the list under that entity also bears any other name in which stamps had been issued for territory, name of any other entity which had had its stamps used in that territory, or new names which had subsequently replaced the name of that entity, together with their respective periods.

List
The list has been comprehensively revised to include extra entities and to direct the links away from the country articles to the (proposed) philatelic articles.

Falkland Islands
 Falkland Islands	1878 –

Falkland Islands Dependencies
 Falkland Islands Dependencies	1946 –

Faroe Islands
 Faroe Islands (British Occupation during WWII)
 Faroe Islands	1975 –

Fiji
 Fiji	1870 –

Finland
 Finland	1856 –
 Åland Islands	1984 –
 Finnish Post Abroad
 Aunus (Finnish Occupation)	1919 only
 Eastern Karelia (Finnish Occupation)	1941–1944
 Karjala 1922 (only)

Fiume
 Arbe	1920 only
 Fiume (Free State)	1918–1924
 Fiume (Yugoslav Occupation)	1945–1947
 Veglia	1920 only

France
 France	1849 –
 French Somali Coast	1902–1967
 Guadeloupe	1884–1947
 Martinique	1886–1947
 Reunion	1885–1974
 St Pierre et Miquelon	1885–1978

French Colonies
 Algeria (French Colony)	1924–1958
 Benin (French Colony)	1892–1899
 Chad (French Colony)	1922–1937
 Dahomey	1899–1944; 1960–1975
 Dakar – Abidjan	1959 only
 Djibouti (French Colony)	1893–1902
 Fezzan and Ghadames	1943–1951
 French Colonies	1859–1886
 French Committee of National Liberation	1943–1945
 French Congo	1891–1906
 French Equatorial Africa (AEF)	1936–1958
 French Guiana	1886–1947
 French Guinea	1892–1944
 French Indian Settlements	1892–1954
 French Morocco	1914–1956
 French Oceanic Settlements	1892–1956
 French Polynesia	1958 –
 French Protectorate, Morocco	1914–1915
 French Soudan	1894–1944
 French Southern and Antarctic Territories	1955 –
 French Territory of Afars and Issas	1967–1977
 French West Africa	1944–1959
 Gabon (French Colony)	1886–1937
 Inini	1932–1946
 Ivory Coast (French Colony)	1892–1944
 Mali Federation	1959–1960
 Mauritania (French Colony)	1906–1944
 Mayotte 1997–
 Middle Congo	1907–1937
 New Caledonia	1860 –
 Niger (French Colony)	1921–1944
 Obock	1892–1894
 Oubangui – Chari	1922–1937
 Oubangui – Chari – Tchad	1915–1922
 Senegal (French Colony)	1887 –
 Senegambia and Niger	1903–1906
 Tahiti	1882–1915
 Togo (French Colony)	1921–1957
 Upper Senegal and Niger	1906–1921
 Upper Volta (French Colony)	1920–1933
 Vietnam (French Colony)	1945–1954
 Wallis and Futuna Islands	1920 –

French Post Offices Abroad
 French post offices abroad
 Alexandria (French Post Office)	1899–1931
 Andorra (French Offices)	1931 –
 Arad (French Occupation)	1919 only
 Beirut (French Post Office)	1905 only
 Castelrosso (French Occupation)	1920–1921
 China (French Post Offices)	1894–1922
 Cilicia (French Occupation)	1918–1921
 Crete (French Post Offices)	1902–1913
 Dedeagatz (French Post Office)	1893–1914
 Egypt (French Post Offices)	1899–1931
 Ethiopia (French Post Offices)	1906–1908
  French Volunteers against Bolshevism(French Post Offices)	1941–1944
 Japan (French Post Offices)	1865–1880
 Kavalla (French Post Office)	1893–1914
 Klaipėda	1923 only
 Korce (Koritza)	1917–1919
 Madagascar (French Post Offices)	1885–1896
 Majunga (French Post Office)	1895 only
 Memel (French Administration)	1920–1923
 Morocco (French Post Offices)	1862–1914
 Port Lagos (French Post Office)	1893–1898
 Port Said (French Post Office)	1899–1931
 Syria (French Occupation)	1919–1924
 Tangier (French Post Office)	1918–1942
 Saar (French Administration)	1920–1935
 Tientsin (French Post Office)	1903–1922
 Vathy (French Post Offices)	1893–1914
 Zanzibar (French Post Office)	1889–1904
 French post offices in the Turkish Empire	1885–1923
 Postage of the Free French Forces in the Levant	1942–1946

Gabon
 Gabon	1959 –

Gambia
 Gambia	1869 –

Georgia
 Georgia	1993 –
 Georgia (pre-Soviet)	1919–1923

German Colonies
 Caroline Islands (Karolinen)	1899–1914
 German East Africa	1893–1916
 German New Guinea	1898–1914
 German Samoa	1900–1914
 German South West Africa	1888–1915
 German Togo	1897–1914
 Kamerun	1897–1915
 Kiautschou	1901–1914
 Mariana Islands (Marianen)	1899–1914
 Marshall Islands (German Colony)	1897–1916

German Post Abroad
 Albania (German Occupation)	1943–1944
 Alsace (German Occupation)	1940–1941
 Alsace-Lorraine	1870–1871
 Belgium (German Occupation)	1914–1918
 China (German Post Offices)	1898–1917
 Dalmatia (German Occupation)	1943–1945
 Dorpat (German Occupation)	1918 only
 Eastern Command Area	1916–1918
 Estonia (German Occupation)	1941 only
 German Ninth Army Post	1918 only
 Postage of German Occupation Forces (WW1)	1914–1918
 German Occupation Issues (World War II)	1939–1945
 German post offices in the Turkish Empire	1884–1914
 Laibach (German Occupation)	1943–1945
 Latvia (German Occupation)	1941 only
 Lithuania (German Occupation)	1941 only
 Lorraine (German Occupation)	1940–1941
 Luxembourg (German Occupation)	1940–1944
 Macedonia (German Occupation)	1944 only
 Montenegro (German Occupation)	1943–1945
 Morocco (German Post Offices)	1899–1917
 Ostland	1941–1945
 Poland (German Occupation WW1)	1915–1918
 Poland (German Occupation World War II)	1939–1945
 Romania (German Occupation)	1917–1918
 Serbia (German Occupation)	1941–1944
 Ukraine (German Occupation)	1941–1944
 Western Command Area	1916–1918
 Zante (German Occupation)	1943–1945
 Zanzibar (German Postal Agency)	1890–1891

German States
 Baden	1851–1871
 Bavaria	1849–1920
 Bergedorf	1861–1867
 Bremen	1855–1867
 Brunswick	1852–1868
 Hamburg	1859–1867
 Foreign post offices in Hamburg (Danish)
 Hanover	1850–1866
 Heligoland	1867–1890
 Holstein	1850, 1864–1867
 Lübeck	1859–1868
 Mecklenburg-Schwerin	1856–1868
 Mecklenburg-Strelitz	1864–1868
 North German Confederation	1868–1871
 Oldenburg	1852–1867
 Prussia	1850–1867
 Saxony	1850–1868
 Schleswig	1864–1868
 Schleswig-Holstein	1850–1868
 Postage of Thurn and Taxis (Northern District)	1849–1866
 Postage of Thurn and Taxis (Southern District)	1852–1867
 Württemberg	1851–1924

Germany
 East Germany	1949–1991
 Germany	1991 –
 Germany (Allied Occupation)	1945–1949
 Imperial Germany	1872–1919
 Third Reich	1933–1945
 Weimar Republic	1919–1932
 West Berlin	1948–1991
 West Germany	1949–1991

Germany (Allied Occupation)
 American, British and Russian Zones	1946–1948
 Anglo-American Zones (Civil Government)	1948–1949
 Anglo-American Zones (Military Government)	1945–1946
 Baden (French Zone)	1947–1949
 Postage of Berlin-Brandenburg in the Russian Zone	1945 only
 French Zone (General Issues)	1945–1946
 Postage of Mecklenburg-Vorpommern in the Russian Zone	1945–1946
 Postage of North West Saxony in the Russian Zone	1945–1946
 Postage of the Rhineland-Palatinate in the French Zone	1947–1949
 Russian Zone (General Issues)	1948–1949
 Saar (French Zone)	1945–1947
 Saxony (Russian Zone)	1945–1946
 Postage of South East Saxony in the Russian Zone	1945–1946
 Thuringia (Russian Zone)	1945–1946
 Württemberg (French Zone)	1947–1949

Ghana
 Ghana	1957 –
 Gold Coast	1875–1957

Gibraltar
 Gibraltar	1886 –

Gilbert and Ellice Islands
 Gilbert and Ellice Islands	1911–1975
 Gilbert Islands	1976–1979
 Kiribati	1979 –
 Tuvalu	1976 –

Greece
 Epirus	1914–1916
 Greece	1861 –
 Ikaria	1912–1913
 Samos	1912–1915

Greek Post Abroad
 Albania (Greek Occupation)	1940–1941
 Dodecanese Islands (Greek Occupation)	1947 only
 Greek Post Offices in the Turkish Empire	1861–1881
 Kavalla (Greek Occupation)	1913 only
 Khios	1913 only
 Lemnos	1912–1913
 Lesbos	1912–1913

Greenland
 Greenland	1938 –

Grenada

Guatemala
 Guatemala	1871 –

Guinea
 Guinea	1959 –

Guinea–Bissau
 Guinea–Bissau	1974 –

Guyana
 Guyana	1966 –

Haiti
 Postage stamps and postal history of Haiti 1881 –

Honduras
 Honduras	1866 –

Hong Kong
 Hong Kong (British colony)	1862 – 1997
 Hong Kong, China 	1997 -

Hungary
 Hungary	1871 –

Iceland
 Iceland	1873 – 2020

India
 Postage stamps and postal history of India	1852 –
 Postage stamps and postal history of the Indian states

Indian Convention States
 Chamba	1886–1948
 Faridkot	1879–1887
 Gwalior	1885–1948
 Jind	1874–1885
 Nabha	1885–1948
 Patiala	1884–1947

Indian Native States
 Alwar	1877 only
 Bamra	1888–1890
 Barwani	1921–1938
 Bhopal	1876–1949
 Bhor	1879–1901
 Bijawar	1935–1937
 Bundi	1894–1948
 Bussahir	1895–1896
 Charkari	1894–1940
 Cochin	1892–1949
 Dhar	1897–1898
 Dungarpur	1932–1948
 Duttia	1893–1899
 Hyderabad	1869–1948
 Idar	1939–1950
 Indore	1886–1950
 Jaipur	1904–1948
 Jammu and Kashmir	1866–1894
 Jasdan	1942 only
 Jhalawar	1887–1900
 Kishangarh	1899–1947
 Las Bela	1897 only
 Morvi	1931–1948
 Nandgaon	1892–1895
 Nawanager	1877–1895
 Orchha	1913–1939
 Poonch	1876–1894
 Rajasthan	1948–1950
 Rajpipla	1880–1886
 Scinde	1852–1854
 Shahpura	1914–1920
 Sirmoor	1879–1902
 Soruth (Saurashtra)	1864–1949
 Travancore	1888–1949
 Travancore – Cochin	1949–1951
 Wadhwan	1888–1892

Indian Overseas Forces
 China Expeditionary Force	1900–1923
 Congo (Indian UN Force)	1962 only
 Gaza (Indian UN Force)	1965 only
 Indian Expeditionary Forces	1914–1922
 Indo–China (Indian Forces)	1954–1968
 Korea (Indian Custodian Forces)	1953 only
 Mosul (Indian Forces)	1919 only

Indo–China
 Annam (Indo–China)	1936 only
 Annam and Tongking	1888–1892
 Cambodia	1951 –
 Cambodia (Indo–China)	1936
 Cochin–China	1886–1889
 Indo–China	1889–1949
 Kampuchea	1980–1989
 Khmer Republic	1971–1975
 Laos	1951 –
 NFLSV (VietCong)	1963–1976
 North Vietnam	1946–1976
 South Vietnam	1955–1976
 Vietnam	1976 –

Indo–Chinese Post in China
 Canton (Indo–Chinese Post Office)	1901–1922
 China (Indo–Chinese Post Offices)	1900–1922
 Hoi–Hao (Indo–Chinese Post Office)	1902–1922
 Kouang–Tcheou	1898–1943
 Mong–Tseu (Indo–Chinese Post Office)	1903–1922
 Pakhoi (Indo–Chinese Post Office)	1903–1922
 Tchongking (Indo – Chinese Post Office)	1903–1922
 Yunnanfu (Indo–Chinese Post Office)	1903–1922

Indonesia
 Indonesia	1945 –
 Riau–Lingga Archipelago	1954–1965
 West Irian	1963 – 1970
 Philatelic items of 2018 Asian Games 2018

International Organisations
 Postage of the Council of Europe	1950 –
 Postage of the International Court of Justice	1934–1958
 Postage of the International Education Office	1944–1960
 Postage of the International Labour Office	1923–1960
 Postage of the International Refugees Organisation	1950 only
 Postage of the International Telecommunication Union	1958–1960
 League of Nations (Geneva)	1922–1944
 UNESCO	1961–1981
 United Nations (UN)	1951 –
 Universal Postal Union (UPU)	1957 –
 World Health Organisation	1948–1975
 Postage of the World Intellectual Property Organisation	1982 only
 Postage of the World Meteorological Organisation	1956–1973

Ionian Islands
 Ionian Islands	1859–1864

Iran
 Iran	1935 –
 Persian Socialist Republic 1919-1921
 Persia	1868–1935

Iraq
 Iraq	1923 –
 Mesopotamia	1917–1922

Ireland, Republic of
 Ireland 1922 –

Israel
 Israel	1948 –

Italian Colonies
 Aegean Islands (Dodecanese)	1912–1945
 Astypalaea	1912–1932
 Benadir	1903–1905
 Cyrenaica	1923–1952
 Eritrea (Italian Colony)	1893–1942
 Italian Colonies (General Issues)	1932–1934
 Italian East Africa	1938–1941
 Italian Somaliland	1905–1936
 Jubaland	1925–1926
 Kalimnos	1912–1932
 Karpathos	1912–1932
 Kasos	1912–1932
 Kastellórizo	1920–1932
 Khalki	1912–1932
 Kos	1912–1932
 Leros	1912–1932
 Lipsos	1912–1932
 Nisyros	1912–1932
 Patmos (Patmo)	1912–1932
 Rhodes	1912–1935
 Syme	1912–1932
 Telos	1912–1932
 Tripolitania	1923–1943

Italian Post Abroad
 Italian post offices in Africa
 Albania (Italian Occupation)	1939–1943
 Benghazi (Italian Post Office)	1901–1912
 Cephalonia and Ithaca (Italian Occupation)	1941 only
 Italian post offices in China
 Constantinople (Italian Post Office)	1908–1923
 Corfu (Italian Occupation)	1923 only
 Corfu and Paxos (Italian Occupation)	1941 only
 Italian post offices in Crete
 Dalmatia (Italian Occupation)	1919–1923
 Durazzo (Italian Post Office)	1902–1916
 Italian post offices in Egypt
 Ethiopia (Italian Occupation)	1936 only
 Fiume and Kupa Zone	1941–1942
 Ionian Islands (Italian Occupation)	1941–1943
 Italian Post Offices in the Turkish Empire	1873–1923
 Jannina (Italian Post Office)	1909–1911
 Jerusalem (Italian Post Office)	1909–1911
 Khania (Italian Post Office)	1900–1912
 Lubiana (Italian Occupation)	1941 only
 Montenegro (Italian Occupation)	1941–1943
 Pechino (Italian Post Office)	1917–1922
 Salonika (Italian Post Office)	1909–1911
 Saseno (Italian Occupation)	1923 only
 Scutari (Italian Post Office)	1909–1915
 Smirne (Italian Post Office)	1909–1911
 Tientsin (Italian Post Office)	1917–1922
 Trentino (Italian Occupation)	1918–1919
 Tripoli (Italian Post Office)	1909–1912
 Valona (Italian Post Office)	1909–1916
 Venezia Giulia (Italian Occupation)	1918–1919

Italian States
 Modena	1852–1860
 Naples	1858–1861
 Neapolitan Provinces	1861–1862
 Papal States	1852–1870
 Parma	1852–1860
 Piedmont	1851–1862
 Romagna	1859–1860
 Sardinia	1851–1863
 Sicily	1859–1860
 Tuscany	1851–1860
 Two Sicilies	1858–1861

Italy
 Campione d'Italia	1944 only
 Italian Social Republic	1944–1945
 Italy	1862 –

Ivory Coast
 Côte d'Ivoire	1959 –

Jamaica
 Jamaica	1860 –

Japan
 Japan	1871 –
 Ryukyu Islands	1948–1972

Japanese Post Abroad
 Brunei (Japanese Occupation)	1942–1945
 Burma (Japanese Occupation)	1942–1945
 Central China (Japanese Occupation)	1941–1944
 Honan (Japanese Occupation)	1941
 Hong Kong (Japanese Occupation)	1945 only
 Hopei (Japanese Occupation)	1941
 Inner Mongolia (Japanese Occupation)	1941–1943
 Japanese Taiwan (Formosa)	1945 only
 Java (Japanese Occupation)	1943–1945
 Kelantan (Japanese Occupation)	1942–1945
 Korea (Japanese Post Offices)	1900–1901
 Kwangtung (Japanese Occupation)	1942–1945
 Malaya (Japanese Occupation)	1942–1945
 Manchukuo	1932–1945
 Mengkiang (Japanese Occupation)	1942–1945
 Nangking and Shanghai (Japanese Occupation)	1941–1945
 North Borneo (Japanese Occupation)	1942–1945
 North China (Japanese Occupation)	1942–1945
 Japanese post in occupied China	1941–1942
 Sarawak (Japanese Occupation)	1942–1945
 Shansi (Japanese Occupation)	1941
 Shantung (Japanese Occupation)	1941
 South China (Japanese Occupation)	1942
 Sumatra (Japanese Occupation)	1943–1945
 Supeh (Japanese Occupation)	1941
 Philippines (Japanese Occupation)	1942–1945
 China (Japanese Post Offices)	1900–1922
 Japanese Naval Control Area	1942–1943

Jordan
 Jordan	1920 –
 Palestine (Jordanian Occupation)	1948–1950
 Transjordan	1920–1949

Kazakhstan
 Kazakhstan	1992 –

Kenya
 Kenya	1963 –

Kiribati

Korea
 Korea (Empire)	1884–1910
 North Korea	1948 –
 South Korea	1946 –
 South Korea (North Korean Occupation)	1950 only

Kosovo
 Kosovo	2000 –

Kuwait
 Kuwait	1923 –

Kyrgyzstan
 Kyrgyzstan	1992 –

Labuan
 Labuan	1879 – 1906
 Malaysia	1963 –
 Straits Settlements	1867 – 1979

Laos

Latvia
 Cesis aka Wenden	1863–1901
 Latvia 1918–1940; 1991 –

Lebanon
 Greater Lebanon	1924–1926
 Lebanon	1924 –

Leeward Islands
 Anguilla	1967 –
 Antigua	1862 –
 Antigua and Barbuda	1981 –
 Barbuda	1922 –
 British Virgin Islands	1968 –
 Danish West Indies	1855–1917
 Dominica	1874 –
 Leeward Islands	1890–1956
 Montserrat	1876 –
 Nevis	1980 –
 Nevis (British Colonial Issues)	1861–1890
 St Christopher	1870–1890
 St Christopher Nevis and Anguilla	1952–1980
 St Kitts	1980 –
 St Kitts Nevis and Anguilla	1967–1971
 St Kitts–Nevis	1903–1980
 Virgin Islands	1866–1968

Lesotho
 Basutoland	1933–1966
 Lesotho	1966 –

Liberia
 Liberia	1860 –

Libya
 Ottoman Empire postal administration
 Foreign postal services in Libya during the Ottoman Empire postal administration
 Italian Occupation: postal administration 1911–1943
 British Administration: postal administration in Tripolitania and Cyrenaica 1942–1951
 French Administration: postal administration in Fezzan 1943–1951
 Cyrenaica Independent Kingdom: postal administration 1950–1951
 Kingdom of Libya: postal administration 1951–1969
 General Posts and Telecommunications Company (GPTC) 1969 –
 L.A.R. Libyan Arab Republic 1969–1977
 S.P.L.A.J. Socialist People's Libyan Arab Jamahiriya 1977–1988
 G.S.P.L.A.J. The Great Socialist People's Libyan Arab Jamahiriya 1988 –

Liechtenstein
 Liechtenstein	1912 –

Lithuania
 Lithuania 1918–1940; 1990 –

Luxembourg
 Luxembourg	1852 –

See also

 List of entities that have issued postage stamps (A–E)
 List of entities that have issued postage stamps (M–Z)

References

Bibliography
 Stanley Gibbons Ltd, Europe and Colonies 1970, Stanley Gibbons Ltd, 1969
 Stanley Gibbons Ltd, various catalogues
 Stuart Rossiter & John Flower, The Stamp Atlas, W H Smith, 1989
 XLCR Stamp Finder and Collector's Dictionary, Thomas Cliffe Ltd, c.1960
 Rimeco S.A. / Switzerland, "Stamp Catalogue of Libya from 1942" and "Stamp Catalogue of Libyan Jamahiriya"

External links
 AskPhil – Glossary of Stamp Collecting Terms
 Encyclopaedia of Postal History

$
$
Issuers

fr:Liste des administrations postales, par pays souverains
it:Stati e amministrazioni postali